Sequoyah Middle School can refer to:
Sequoyah Middle School (Clayton County, Georgia)
Sequoyah Middle School (Doraville, Georgia)
Sequoyah Middle School (Oklahoma)
Sequoyah Middle School (Washington)